Melek Sina Baydur (born 1948) is a Turkish retired diplomat and former ambassador of Turkey.

Melek Sina Baydur served as Ambassador of Turkey to Bosnia and Herzegovina in Sarajevo between 03 January 2003 and 16 December 2005. Her next appointment as an ambassador was to Slovenia on 1 January 2006. She served in Ljubljana until 29 February 200.

Currently, she is retired.

References

Living people
1948 births
People from Karadeniz Ereğli
Üsküdar American Academy alumni
Istanbul University alumni
Turkish women ambassadors
Ambassadors of Turkey to Slovenia
Ambassadors of Turkey to Bosnia and Herzegovina